The 1964–65 Israel State Cup (Gvia HaMedina) was the 26th season of Israel's nationwide football cup competition and the 11th after the Israeli Declaration of Independence.

The competition began on 7 November 1964, with first round matches, involving Liga Bet and Liga Gimel teams. For the first time since 1951–52, the competition was played throughout the duration of a single season, with the final between Maccabi Tel Aviv and Bnei Yehuda being played on 29 June 1965. Maccabi won the match in extra time by a single goal and earned its second consecutive cup and 12th overall.

Results

Third Round
The 64 second round winners were joined in this round by the teams from Liga Alef. Matches were played on 12 December 1964.

Fourth Round

Replays

Fifth Round

Replays

Sixth Round

Quarter-finals

Replay

Semi-finals

Final

Notes

References
100 Years of Football 1906-2006, Elisha Shohat (Israel), 2006

External links
 Israel Football Association website

Israel State Cup
State Cup
Israel State Cup seasons